The Art Gallery of Peterborough is a free admission, non-profit public art gallery in Peterborough, Ontario, Canada. A registered charity that depends on the support of its members, it was founded in 1974 by an independent board of volunteers. In 1977 it was given the Foster House by the City of Peterborough, a historical residence set in parkland beside Little Lake. The collection presently numbers over 1,300 pieces. In addition to its permanent collection and exhibitions, the gallery offers many educational programs for adults and children. There is also a gift shop featuring a variety of works by local and national artisans.

The acquisition program is funded by private donations and matching grants from the Canada Council. Annual operating and management costs are provided by the Ontario Arts Council, the Canada Council for the Arts, and community fundraising efforts. The Peterborough municipal government provides a grant to cover building maintenance and landscaping. The gallery is a member of the Ontario Association of Art Galleries.

Prominent Canadian artists with works in the collection include David Bierk, Ron Bloore, Ivan Eyre, Jack Shadbolt, and Bill Vazan.

Exhibitions
The art gallery holds frequent exhibitions. A sample:
2011 (Summer) Robert Houle - Paris/Ojibwa
2010 (Winter) Allyson Mitchell - Ladies Sasquatch
2009 (Summer) Nobuo Kubota - Hokusai Revisited
2009 (Winter) Mendelson Joe - Joe's Politicians
2008 Kawartha Autumn Studio Tour collection
2000 
1996 
1994 
1993 
1992 
1990

References

External links

Museums in Peterborough, Ontario
Art museums and galleries in Ontario
Modernist architecture in Canada
Art museums established in 1974
1974 establishments in Ontario